Belfast Airport may refer to:

 Belfast International Airport, serving Belfast, Northern Ireland, the main international airport
 George Best Belfast City Airport, serving Belfast, Northern Ireland, a smaller airport closer to Belfast City Centre